Alberta Provincial Highway No. 806, commonly referred to as Highway 806, is a north–south highway in central Alberta, Canada.

History 
The  section of Highway 806 between Beiseker and Acme has had multiple designations in its history.  Along with a portion of Highway 575, the route was originally designated as part of Highway 21.  In 1958, the southern portion of Highway 21 was realigned to Highway 1 (Trans-Canada Highway) east of Strathmore, and the former section was renumbered as Highway 21A.  However, in 1962 the route was again renumbered to Highway 26, as at the time it connected the Village of Carbon Highway 9 and Highway 21.  Highway 26 was decommissioned in 1970 and in 1972, it was renumbered to its current designation.

Major intersections 
From south to north:

References 

806